Jotham Johnson (born October 21, 1905 in Newark, New Jersey; died February 8, 1967, in New York, New York) was an American classical archaeologist.

He was educated at Princeton University (A.B. 1926) and the University of Pennsylvania where he received his doctorate in 1931.  He taught at the University of Pittsburgh and then joined the faculty of New York University. He was the chairman of classics at the time of his death from an apparent heart attack.

He was involved in archaeological fieldwork at the site of Dura Europos in Syria.  Later he became involved in the excavations at the site of Minturnae in Italy, under the auspices of the University of Pennsylvania.  With Kenan T. Erim he conducted fieldwork at Aphrodisias in the early 1960s.

In 1961 he became president of the Archaeological Institute of America where he served until 1964. Johnson was also the first editor of the Institute's magazine Archaeology.

Johnson was married to the former Sarah Jean Coates.

Works
[dissertation] Dura studies (Roma, Tip. ditta f.lli Pallotta, 1931).
 1935-. Excavations at Minturnae. Philadelphia: University Museum by the University of Pennsylvania Press.
 1933. Excavations at Minturnae, II. Inscriptions, Part I, Republican Magistri. Philadelphia: University Museum by the University of Pennsylvania Press. Available online.

References

External links
Prof. Jotham Johnson, 61, Dies; Chairman of Classics at NYU (New York Times obituary; Thursday, February 9, 1967) (pay-per-view)

1905 births
1967 deaths
University of Pennsylvania alumni
Classical archaeologists
New York University faculty
University of Pittsburgh faculty
Princeton University alumni
20th-century American archaeologists
Presidents of the Archaeological Institute of America